Agonopterix propinquella is a species of moth of the family Depressariidae. It is found in Europe.

The wingspan is 16–19 mm. Adults are on wing from September to July depending on the location.

The larvae feed on Arctium, Carduus, Centaurea, Cirsium arvense, Cirsium vulgare, Cynara, Mycelis muralis and Serratula. They initially mine the leaves of their host plant. Larvae can be found from July to early August. They are apple green with a black head.

References

External links
 Agonopterix propinquella at UKmoths

Moths described in 1835
Agonopterix
Moths of Europe